Middlesex South was a provincial riding in Ontario, Canada, that was created for the 1934 election. It was abolished prior to the 1975 election. It was merged into the riding of Middlesex.

Members of Provincial Parliament

References

Notes

Citations

Former provincial electoral districts of Ontario